Spinning Boris is a 2003 American comedy film directed by Roger Spottiswoode and starring Jeff Goldblum, Anthony LaPaglia and Liev Schreiber. In the film, Boris Yeltsin secretly hires three American consultants during his 1996 reelection campaign, when his approval rating was at 6%. With the help of the consultants, Yeltsin won the election six months later. The film claimed to be based on the true story of three American political consultants who worked for the successful reelection campaign of Boris Yeltsin in 1996.

Plot 
In early 1996, three Republican campaign operatives take a secret job to assist Boris Yeltsin's reelection. Once in Moscow, they learn Yeltsin is polling at 6% against the communists with the election only a few months away. They decide to vote on whether to stay.  Dick Dresner wants to go home, George Gorton and Joe Shumate vote to stay in Moscow. They get the attention of Yeltsin's daughter. They then start to do polling, focus groups, messaging, and spin. Yeltsin's poll numbers begin to go up.  The three men are unsure who hired them. They do not know whether Yeltsin's allies want him to win.

Cast

See also
 Boris Yeltsin presidential campaign, 1996
 History of Russia (1991–present)#"Shock therapy"
 Shock Therapy

References

External links

Article about film (Russian)
Time Magazine article (July 15, 1996) detailing the events in the movie

2003 films
American political comedy-drama films
Cultural depictions of Boris Yeltsin
2000s political comedy-drama films
American films based on actual events
Films set in 1996
Films set in Russia
Films about elections
Films about presidents
Films directed by Roger Spottiswoode
Films scored by Jeff Danna
2003 comedy films
2003 drama films
2000s English-language films
2000s American films